Bărboieni is a village in Nisporeni District, Moldova.

Notable people
 Vadim Cojocaru

References

Villages of Nisporeni District
Populated places on the Prut